Elachista floccella is a moth of the family Elachistidae. It is found in Australia in the Australian Capital Territory, New South Wales and Tasmania.

The wingspan is 11.2-12.8 mm for males and 9.5-12.4 mm for females. The forewings are creamy white. The hindwings are grey.

The larvae feed on both narrow- and broad-leaved variants of Lepidosperma laterale. They mine the leaves of their host plant. Young larvae mine upwards, creating a straight and narrow initial stage of the mine. Later, the mine slowly widens and often turns downwards. The mine reaches a length of about 100 mm. Pupation takes place outside of the mine on a leaf of the host plant.

References

Moths described in 2011
floccella
Moths of Australia